The third season of the television series Dallas aired on CBS during the 1979–80 TV season.

Cast

Starring
In alphabetical order:
 Barbara Bel Geddes as Miss Ellie Ewing (25 episodes)
 Jim Davis as Jock Ewing (25 episodes)
 Patrick Duffy as Bobby Ewing (25 episodes)
 Linda Gray as Sue Ellen Ewing (25 episodes)
 Larry Hagman as J.R. Ewing (25 episodes)
 Steve Kanaly as Ray Krebbs (16 episodes)
 Ken Kercheval as Cliff Barnes (21 episodes)
 Victoria Principal as Pamela Barnes Ewing (25 episodes) 
 Charlene Tilton as Lucy Ewing (24 episodes)

Also starring
 Mary Crosby as Kristin Shepard (20 episodes)
 Randolph Powell as Alan Beam (16 episodes)
 Keenan Wynn as Willard "Digger" Barnes (10 episodes)

Special guest stars
 Don Porter as Matt Devlin (4 episodes)
 Mel Ferrer as Harrison Page (2 episodes)
 E. J. André as Eugene Bullock (1 episode)

Notable guest stars
Future series regular Susan Howard returns as Donna Culver for four episodes. The character Jenna Wade, who will be portrayed by series regular Priscilla Presley in later seasons, also returns for two episodes, now played by Francine Tacker. Longrunning supporting actors Jared Martin (Steven "Dusty" Farlow). George O. Petrie (Harv Smithfield), Stephanie Blackmore (Serena Wald), Tom Fuccello (Dave Culver), Jeff Cooper (Dr. Simon Ellby), Dennis Patrick (Vaughn Leland) and Barry Corbin (Sheriff Fenton Washburn) make their debuts. Mel Ferrer (Harrison Page) appears in two episodes as Pam's immediate supervisor at The Store after her promotion to Buyer. Stephen Elliott (Scotty Demarest) and Martha Scott (Patricia Shepard), who appear in one and two episodes, respectively, will return as "special guest stars" for seasons 8 and 10 (Elliot), and 9 (Scott). Characters Gary (now played by Ted Shackelford) and Valene Ewing (Joan Van Ark) appear for one and two episodes, respectively, promoting Dallas spinoff Knots Landing, premiering in December 1979.

Crew
David Jacobs, creator of the series, returns to write his final Dallas episode, "Return Engagements", which leads into the pilot episode of Jacobs' brainchild Knots Landing. The season's episode writers include showrunner Leonard Katzman, the returning Camille Marchetta, Arthur Bernard Lewis, Worley Thorne, D. C. Fontana, Richard Fontana, and Rena Down, as well as new additions Loraine Despres, Jeff Young, Linda B. Elstad and Barbara Searles. Lee Rich and Philip Capice continue to serve as executive producers. Katzman serves as producer, and Cliff Fenneman as associate producer, while Arthur Bernard Lewis continues as executive story editor, and Camille Marchetta as story editor.

DVD release
Season three of Dallas was released by Warner Bros. Home Video, on a Region 1 DVD box set of five double-sided DVDs, on August 9, 2005. In addition to the 25 episodes, it also includes commentaries by Patrick Duffy and Linda Gray, and the featurette "Who Shot J.R.?: The Dallas Phenomenon".

Knots Landing

The Dallas spin-off series Knots Landing premiered in December 1979, and throughout the season, three Knots Landing episodes featured Dallas characters: Bobby (Patrick Duffy) appeared in Pilot (airing on December 27, 1979); J.R. (Larry Hagman) in Community Spirit (January 3, 1980); and Lucy (Charlene Tilton) in Home is for the Healing (January 31, 1980, her only Knots Landing appearance).

Episodes

References

External links
 List of Dallas season 3 episodes at the Internet Movie Database

1979 American television seasons
1980 American television seasons
Dallas (1978 TV series) seasons